The G20 or Group of 20 is an intergovernmental forum comprising 19 countries and the European Union (EU). It works to address major issues related to the global economy, such as international financial stability, climate change mitigation, and sustainable development. 

The G20 is composed of most of the world's largest economies, including both industrialised and developing nations; it accounts for around 80% of gross world product (GWP), 75% of international trade, two-thirds of the global population, and 60% of the world's land area. 

The G20 was founded in 1999 in response to several world economic crises. Since 2008, it has convened at least once a year, with summits involving each member's head of government or state, finance minister, or foreign minister, and other high-ranking officials; the EU is represented by the European Commission and the European Central Bank. Other countries, international organizations, and nongovernmental organizations are invited to attend the summits, some on a permanent basis.

In its 2009 summit, the G20 declared itself the primary venue for international economic and financial cooperation. The group's stature has risen during the subsequent decade, and it is recognised by analysts as exercising considerable global influence; it is also criticised for its limited membership, lack of enforcement powers, and for the alleged undermining of existing international institutions. Summits are often met with protests, particularly by anti-globalization groups.

History

Founding
The G20 is the latest in a series of post–World War II initiatives aimed at international coordination of economic policy, which include institutions such as the "Bretton Woods twins", the International Monetary Fund and the World Bank, and what is now the World Trade Organization.

The G20 was foreshadowed at the Cologne summit of the G7 in June 1999, and formally established at the G7 Finance Ministers' meeting on 26 September 1999 with an inaugural meeting on 15–16 December 1999 in Berlin. Canadian finance minister Paul Martin was chosen as the first chairman and German finance minister Hans Eichel hosted the inaugural meeting.

A 2004 report by Colin I. Bradford and Johannes F. Linn of the Brookings Institution asserted the group was founded primarily at the initiative of Eichel, the concurrent chair of the G7. However, Bradford later described then-Finance Minister of Canada (and future Prime Minister of Canada) Paul Martin as "the crucial architect of the formation of the G-20 at finance minister level", and as the one who later "proposed that the G-20 countries move to leaders level summits". Canadian academic and journalistic sources have also identified the G20 as a project initiated by Martin and his American counterpart then-Treasury Secretary Larry Summers. All acknowledge, however, that Germany and the United States played a key role in bringing their vision into reality.

Martin and Summers conceived of the G20 in response to the series of massive debt crises that had spread across emerging markets in the late 1990s, beginning with the Mexican peso crisis and followed by the 1997 Asian financial crisis, the 1998 Russian financial crisis, and eventually impacting the United States, most prominently in the form of the collapse of the prominent hedge fund Long-Term Capital Management in the autumn of 1998. It illustrated to them that in a rapidly globalizing world, the G7, G8, and the Bretton Woods system would be unable to provide financial stability, and they conceived of a new, broader permanent group of major world economies that would give a voice and new responsibilities in providing it.

The G20 membership was decided by Eichel's deputy Caio Koch-Weser and Summers's deputy Timothy Geithner. According to the political economist Robert Wade:

Early topics
The G20's primary focus has been governance of the global economy. Summit themes have varied from year to year. 
The theme of the 2006 G20 ministerial meeting was "Building and Sustaining Prosperity". The issues discussed included domestic reforms to achieve "sustained growth", global energy and resource commodity markets, reform of the World Bank and IMF, and the impact of demographic changes.

In 2007, South Africa hosted the secretariat with Trevor A. Manuel, South African Minister of Finance as chairperson of the G20.
 
In 2008, Guido Mantega, Brazil's Minister of Finance, was the G20 chairperson and proposed dialogue on competition in financial markets, clean energy, economic development and fiscal elements of growth and development.

On 11 October 2008 after a meeting of G7 finance ministers, US President George W. Bush stated that the next meeting of the G20 would be important in finding solutions to the burgeoning economic crisis of 2008.

Summits
The Summit of G20 Finance Ministers and Central Bank Governors, who prepare the leaders' summit and implement their decisions, was created as a response both to the financial crisis of 2007–2008 and to a growing recognition that key emerging countries were not adequately included in the core of global economic discussion and governance. Additionally, G20 summits of heads of state or government were held.

After the 2008 debut summit in Washington, DC, G20 leaders met twice a year: in London and Pittsburgh in 2009, and in Toronto and Seoul in 2010.

Since 2011, when France chaired and hosted the G20, the summits have been held only once a year. The 2016 summit was held in Hangzhou, China, the 2017 summit was held in Hamburg, Germany, the 2018 summit was held in Buenos Aires, Argentina, the 2019 summit was held in Osaka, Japan, the 2020 summit was scheduled in Riyadh, Saudi Arabia but it was held virtually due to Covid-19, the 2021 summit was held in Rome, Italy and the 2022 summit was held in Bali, Indonesia. 

A number of other ministerial-level G20 meetings have been held since 2010. Agriculture ministerial meetings were conducted in 2011 and 2012; meetings of foreign ministers were held in 2012 and 2013; trade ministers met in 2012 and 2014, and employment ministerial meetings have taken place annually since 2010.

In 2012, the G20 Ministers of Tourism and Heads of Delegation of G20 member countries and other invited States, as well as representatives from the World Travel and Tourism Council (WTTC), World Tourism Organization (UNWTO) and other organisations in the Travel & Tourism sector met in Mérida, Mexico, on May 16 at the 4th G20 meeting and focused on 'Tourism as a means to Job Creation'. As a result of this meeting and The World Travel & Tourism Council's Visa Impact Research, later on the Leaders of the G20, convened in Los Cabos on 18–19 June, would recognise the impact of Travel & Tourism for the first time. That year, the G20 Leaders Declaration added the following statement: "We recognise the role of travel and tourism as a vehicle for job creation, economic growth and development, and, while recognizing the sovereign right of States to control the entry of foreign nationals, we will work towards developing travel facilitation initiatives in support of job creation, quality work, poverty reduction and global growth."

In March 2014, the former Australian foreign minister Julie Bishop, when Australia was hosting the 2014 G20 summit in Brisbane, proposed to ban Russia from the summit over its annexation of Ukrainian Crimea. 
The BRICS foreign ministers subsequently reminded Bishop that "the custodianship of the G20 belongs to all Member States equally and no one Member State can unilaterally determine its nature and character."

In 2016, the G20 framed its commitment to the 2030 Agenda (Sustainable Development Goals) in three key themes; the promotion of strong sustainable and balanced growth; protection of the planet from degradation; and furthering co-operation with low-income and developing countries. At the G20 Summit in Hangzhou, members agreed on an action plan and issued a high level principles document to member countries to help facilitate the agenda's implementation.

Japan hosted the 2019 summit, The 2020 summit was to be held in Saudi Arabia, but was instead held virtually on 21–22 November 2020 due to the COVID-19 pandemic under the presidency of Saudi Arabia. 2021 G20 Rome summit which was held in Rome, the capital city of Italy, on 30–31 October 2021.

Indonesia held the G20 presidency from 1 December 2021 to 30 November 2022. During its presidency, Indonesia has focused on the global COVID-19 pandemic and how to collectively overcome the challenges related to it. The three priorities of Indonesia's G20 presidency: global health architecture, digital transformations, sustainable energy transitions.
India holds the G20 presidency from 1st December 2022, with the presidency theme of ‘Vasudhaiva Kutumbakam’ - ‘One Earth One Family One Future’.

List of summits

Chair rotation
To decide which member nation gets to chair the G20 leaders' meeting for a given year, all members, except the European Union, are assigned to one of five different groupings, with all but one group having four members, the other having three. Nations from the same region are placed in the same group, except Group 1 and Group 2. All countries within a group are eligible to take over the G20 Presidency when it is their group's turn. Therefore,the states within the relevant group need to negotiate among themselves to select the next G20 President. Each year, a different G20 member country assumes the presidency starting from 1 December until 30 November. This system has been in place since 2010, when South Korea, which is in Group 5, held the G20 chair. The table below lists the nations' groupings:

To ensure continuity, the presidency is supported by a "troika" made up of the current, immediate past and next host countries.

Organization
The G20 operates without a permanent secretariat or staff. The group's chair rotates annually among the members and is selected from a different regional grouping of countries. The incumbent chair establishes a temporary secretariat for the duration of its term, which coordinates the group's work and organizes its meetings. The 2021 summit was held in Italy. The 2022 summit is held in Bali, Indonesia. The current chair is held by India. The 2023 and 2024 summits will be hosted by India and Brazil respectively.

Proposed permanent secretariat
In 2010, President of France Nicolas Sarkozy proposed the establishment of a permanent G20 secretariat, similar to the United Nations. Seoul and Paris were suggested as possible locations for its headquarters. Brazil and China supported the establishment of a secretariat, while Italy and Japan expressed opposition to the proposal. South Korea proposed a "cyber secretariat" as an alternative. It has been argued that the G20 has been using the OECD as a secretariat.

Members
, there are 20 members in the group: Argentina, Australia, Brazil, Canada, China, France, Germany, India, Indonesia, Italy, South Korea, Japan, Mexico, Russia, Saudi Arabia, South Africa, Turkey, the United Kingdom, the United States, and the European Union. Guest invitees include, amongst others, Spain, the United Nations, the World Bank, the African Union and ASEAN.

Representatives include, at the leaders' summits, the leaders of nineteen countries and of the European Union, and, at the ministerial-level meetings, the finance ministers and central bank governors of nineteen countries and of the European Union.

In addition, each year, the G20's guests include Spain; the Chair of ASEAN; two African countries (the chair of the African Union and a representative of the New Partnership for Africa's Development (NEPAD) and a country (sometimes more than one) invited by the presidency, usually from its own region. 
 
The first of the tables below lists the member entities and their leaders, finance ministers and central bank governors. The second table lists relevant statistics such as population and GDP figures for each member, as well as detailing memberships of other international organizations, such as the G7, BRICS and MIKTA. Total GDP figures are given in millions of US dollars.

Leaders

Current Leaders

Member country data

In addition to these 20 members, the chief executive officers of several other international forums and institutions participate in meetings of the G20. These include the managing director and Chairman of the International Monetary Fund, the President of the World Bank, the International Monetary and Financial Committee and the Chairman of the Development Assistance Committee.

The G20's membership does not reflect exactly the 20 largest economies of the world in any given year; as the organization states:

Role of Asian countries
A 2011 report released by the Asian Development Bank (ADB) predicted that large Asian economies such as China and India would play a more important role in global economic governance in the future. The report claimed that the rise of emerging market economies heralded a new world order, in which the G20 would become the global economic steering committee. The ADB furthermore noted that Asian countries had led the global recovery following the late-2000s recession. It predicted that the region would have a greater presence on the global stage, shaping the G20's agenda for balanced and sustainable growth through strengthening intraregional trade and stimulating domestic demand.

Invitees

Typically, several participants that are not full members of the G20 are extended invitations to participate in the summits. Permanent guest invitees are: the government of Spain; the Chair of the Association of Southeast Asian Nations; the Chair of the African Union; and a representative of the New Partnership for Africa's Development are invited in their capacities as leaders of their organisations and as heads of government of their home states. In addition, the leaders of the Financial Stability Board, the International Labour Organization, the International Monetary Fund, the Organisation for Economic Co-operation and Development, the United Nations, the World Bank Group and the World Trade Organization are invited and participate in pre-summit planning within the policy purview of their respective organisation.

Other invitees are chosen by the host country, usually one or two countries from its region. For example, South Korea invited Singapore. International organisations which have been invited in the past include the Asia-Pacific Economic Cooperation (APEC), the Basel Committee on Banking Supervision (BCBS), the Commonwealth of Independent States (CIS), the Eurasian Economic Community (EAEC), the European Central Bank (ECB), the Food and Agriculture Organization (FAO), the Global Governance Group (3G) and the Gulf Cooperation Council (GCC). Previously, the Netherlands had a similar status to Spain while the rotating presidency of the Council of the European Union would also receive an invitation, but only in that capacity and not as their own state's leader (such as the Czech premiers Mirek Topolánek and Jan Fischer during the 2009 summits).

Permanent guest invitees

Agenda

Financial focus
The initial G20 agenda, as conceived by US, Canadian and German policymakers, was very much focused on the sustainability of sovereign debt and global financial stability, in an inclusive format that would bring in the largest developing economies as equal partners. During a summit in November 2008, the leaders of the group pledged to contribute trillions to international financial organizations, including the World Bank and IMF, mainly for re-establishing the global financial system.

Since inception, the recurring themes covered by G20 summit participants have related in priority to global economic growth, international trade and financial market regulation.

Inclusive growth
The G20 countries account for almost 75% of global carbon emissions. After the adoption of the UN Sustainable Development Goals and the Paris Climate Agreement in 2015, more "issues of global significance" were added to the G20 agenda: migration, digitisation, employment, healthcare, the economic empowerment of women and development aid. Despite promises G20 nations subsidised fossil fuel companies over $3.3 trillion between 2015 and 2021.

The G20 countries account for almost 75% of the global carbon emissions and promised in 2009 to phase out 'inefficient subsidies'. Despite these promises G20 nations have subsidised fossil fuel companies over $3.3 trillion between 2015 and 2021, with several nations increasing subsidies; Australia (+48.2%), the US (+36.7%), Indonesia (+26.6%), France (+23.8%), China (+4.1%), Brazil (+3.0%), Mexico (+2.6%).  China alone generates over half of the coal-generated electricity in the world.

Interrelated themes
Wolfgang Schäuble, German Federal Minister of Finance, has insisted on the interconnected nature of the issues facing G20 nations, be they purely financial or developmental, and the need to reach effective, cross-cutting policy measures: "Globalization has lifted hundreds of millions out of poverty, but there is also a growing rise in frustration in some quarters […] development, [national] security and migration are all interlinked"

G20 Engagement Groups 
The G20 Engagement Groups are independent collectives that are led by organisations of the host country. They represent a diverse group of stakeholders and work collectively to develop non-binding policy recommendations formally submitted to the G20 leaders for consideration. 

For the 2022 G20 hosted by Indonesia, there are 10 Engagement Groups formed to facilitate independent stakeholders in developing proposals and policy recommendations for G20 leaders.

Influence and accountability
The G20's prominent membership gives it a strong input on global policy despite lacking any formal ability to enforce rules. There are disputes over the legitimacy of the G20, and criticisms of its organisation and the efficacy of its declarations.

The G20's transparency and accountability have been questioned by critics, who call attention to the absence of a formal charter and the fact that the most important G20 meetings are closed-door. In 2001, the economist Frances Stewart proposed an Economic Security Council within the United Nations as an alternative to the G20. In such a council, members would be elected by the General Assembly based on their importance to the world economy, and the contribution they are willing to provide to world economic development.

The cost and extent of summit-related security is often a contentious issue in the hosting country, and G20 summits have attracted protesters from a variety of backgrounds, including information activists, opponents of fractional-reserve banking and anti-capitalists. In 2010, the Toronto G20 summit sparked mass protests and rioting, leading to the largest mass arrest in Canada's history.

Views on the G20's exclusivity of membership
Although the G20 has stated that the group's "economic weight and broad membership gives it a high degree of legitimacy and influence over the management of the global economy and financial system", its legitimacy has been challenged. A 2011 report for the Danish Institute for International Studies criticised the G20's exclusivity, particularly highlighting its underrepresentation of African countries and its practice of inviting observers from non-member states as a mere "concession at the margins", which does not grant the organisation representational legitimacy. Concerning the membership issue, US President Barack Obama noted the difficulty of pleasing everyone: "Everybody wants the smallest possible group that includes them. So, if they're the 21st largest nation in the world, they want the G21, and think it's highly unfair if they have been cut out." Others stated in 2011 that the exclusivity is not an insurmountable problem and proposed mechanisms by which it could become more inclusive.

Norwegian perspective

In line with Norway's emphasis on inclusive international processes, the United Nations, and the UN system, in a 2010 interview with Der Spiegel, the current prime minister of Norway Jonas Gahr Støre called the G20 "one of the greatest setbacks since World War II" as 173 nations who are all members of the UN are not among the G20. This includes Norway, a major developed economy and the seventh-largest contributor to UN international development programs, which is not a member of the EU, and thus is not represented in the G20 even indirectly. Norway, like other such nations, has little or no voice within the group. Støre argued that the G20 undermines the legitimacy of international organizations set up in the aftermath of World War II, such as the IMF, World Bank and United Nations:

Norway, under the government of Erna Solberg, attended the 2017 G20 summit in Hamburg, Germany.

Spanish position on membership
Spain is the world's thirteenth largest economy by nominal GDP (the fifteenth largest by purchasing power parity), the fourth in the European Union, the second among Spanish-speaking countries, the third in Iberoamerica. In addition, since the 1990s several Spanish companies have gained multinational status, and Spain is an important foreign investor worldwide. Its numbers clearly exceed the numbers of several current members of the G20 such as Argentina or South Africa. These facts supported the idea that Spain should seek permanent membership in the G20. However, Spain, a permanent guest, does not plan to request official membership.

Polish aspirations
In contrast with the Spanish position, the Polish government has repeatedly asked to join the G20.

Before the 2009 G20 London summit, the Polish government expressed an interest in joining with Spain and the Netherlands and condemned an "organisational mess" in which a few European leaders speak in the name of all the EU without legitimate authorisation in cases which belong to the European Commission.

During a 2010 meeting with foreign diplomats, Polish president Lech Kaczyński said:

In 2012, Tim Ferguson wrote in Forbes that swapping Argentina for Poland should be considered, claiming that the Polish economy was headed toward a leadership role in Europe and its membership would be more legitimate. A similar opinion was expressed by Marcin Sobczyk in the Wall Street Journal. Mamta Murthi from the World Bank said: "To be in 'a club', what Poland can do is to continue working as if it already is in the club it wants to join."

In 2014, consulting company Ernst & Young published its report about optimal members for G20. After analyzing trade, institutional and investment links Poland was included as one of the optimal members.

G20 membership has been part of the look program of Poland's Law and Justice party and President Andrzej Duda. In March 2017, Deputy Prime Minister of Poland Mateusz Morawiecki took part in a meeting of G20 financial ministers in Baden-Baden as the first Polish representative.

Global Governance Group (3G) response
In June 2010, Singapore's representative to the United Nations warned the G20 that its decisions would affect "all countries, big and small", and asserted that prominent non-G20 members should be included in financial reform discussions. Singapore thereafter took a leading role in organizing the Global Governance Group (3G), an informal grouping of 30 non-G20 countries (including several microstates and many Third World countries) with the aim of collectively channelling their views into the G20 process more effectively. Singapore's chairing of the 3G was cited as a rationale for inviting Singapore to the November 2010 G20 summit in South Korea, as well as 2011, 2013, 2014, 2015, 2016, and 2017 summits.

Foreign Policy critiques
The American magazine Foreign Policy has published articles condemning the G20, in terms of its principal function as an alternative to the supposedly exclusive G8. It questions the actions of some of the G20 members and advances the notion that some nations should not have membership in the first place. Furthermore, with the effects of the Great Recession still ongoing, the magazine has criticized the G20's efforts to implement reforms of the world's financial institutions, branding such efforts as failures.

Calls for removal of Russia
In March 2022, following Russia's invasion of Ukraine, U.S. President Joe Biden called for the removal of Russia from the group. Alternatively, he suggested that Ukraine be allowed to attend the 2022 summit, despite its lack of membership. Canadian Prime Minister Justin Trudeau also said the group should "re-evaluate" Russia's participation. Russia claims it would not be a significant issue, as most G20 members are already fighting Russia economically due to the war. China suggested that expelling Russia would be counterproductive. In November 2022, Indonesia and Russia stated that Vladimir Putin would not attend the G20 summit in person, but may attend virtually. During the 2022 summit, Ukrainian president Volodymyr Zelenskyy appeared in a video statement and repeatedly addressed the assembly as the 'G19' as a means of indicating his viewpoint that Russia should be removed from the group.

See also
Model G20
G8
G7
League of Nations

Notes

References

Bibliography

Further reading

External links

 
 G20 website of the OECD
 G20 Information Centre from the University of Toronto
 A Guide To Committees, Groups, And Clubs from the International Monetary Fund
 G20 Special Report from The Guardian
 
 The G20's role in the post-crisis world by FRIDE
 The Group of Twenty – A History, 2007
 Economics for Everyone: G20 – Gearing for Growth

 
Economic country classifications
Intergovernmental organizations
Organizations established in 1999